is a double-A side single released as the 27th single of Japanese pop band W-inds.

Music video
Ryohei Chiba and Ryuichi Ogata choreographed the dance.

Track listing
"New World"
"Truth (Saigo no Shinjitsu)"
"Fighting for Love"
"Tribute"
"New World (Radio Mix)"

Media appearances
"New World" was used as the ending theme for the second season of House M.D. in Japan
"Truth (Saigo no Shinjitsu)" was used as the beginning theme for

Charts and sales

Oricon sales charts (Japan)

2009 singles
W-inds songs
Songs written by Ne-Yo